Hincaster is a civil parish in the South Lakeland District of Cumbria, England.  It contains eleven listed buildings that are recorded in the National Heritage List for England.  Of these, one is listed at Grade II*, the middle of the three grades, and the others are at Grade II, the lowest grade.  The parish contains the village of Hincaster and the surrounding countryside.  The Lancaster Canal passed through the parish, including the Hincaster Tunnel.  This part of the canal is now dry, but structures associated with it are listed, including the portals of the tunnel, a cottage, and accommodation bridges and a railway bridge crossing the canal or the sunken horse path (which is a Scheduled Monument).  The other listed buildings are farmhouses and farm buildings.


Key

Buildings

References

Citations

Sources

Lists of listed buildings in Cumbria